The Merkel Mark II is an American homebuilt aerobatic biplane that was designed by Edwin Merkel and produced by the Merkel Airplane Company of Wichita, Kansas in the form of plans for amateur construction.

Designer Merkel died on 12 March 2012 and plans are no longer available.

Design and development
The Mark II features a two-seats-in-tandem open cockpit with an optional bubble canopy, fixed conventional landing gear and a single engine in tractor configuration. The Mark II was intended as a two-seat trainer version as a companion to a planned single-seat competition version.

The aircraft is made from welded steel tubing with the airframe covered in sheet aluminum. Its  span wings employ a NACA 23012 airfoil and each has a single torsional spar. The standard engine recommended was a  Franklin Engine Company powerplant.

Specifications (Mark II)

References

External links
Photo of a Merkel Mark II
Color photo of a Merkel Mark II

Mark II
1960s United States sport aircraft
Single-engined tractor aircraft
Biplanes
Homebuilt aircraft
Aerobatic aircraft